The Dentsu Building or  is a high-rise building in the Shiodome area of Minato, Tokyo, Japan. The building houses the corporate offices of Dentsu.

Description 
48 floors rise to 213.34 m (700 ft), it is the twelfth-tallest building in Tokyo and second-tallest in Shiodome, next to Shiodome City Center. It was designed by French architect Jean Nouvel and completed in 2002.  It was built over the site of Tokyo's first train station, and sits aside the Hamarikyu Gardens, formerly the site of a shōguns vacation home.  The Dentsu building is an example of contemporary architecture, featuring collectors on the roof to utilize rainwater for its plumbing system, as well as ceramic dots on the windows which, in concert with computerized window shades, control climate control expenditure. The Dentsu building has 70 elevators, including a special elevator reserved only for VIPs and executive management.

With the exception of sludge, all waste materials produced in the construction of the Dentsu Building were recycled.

In 2021, the building was sold to an SPE composed of Hulic, Mizuho Leasing, etc.

See also

References

Skyscraper office buildings in Tokyo
Office buildings completed in 2002
Jean Nouvel buildings
2002 establishments in Japan
Shiodome
Buildings and structures in Minato, Tokyo
Dentsu
Retail buildings in Tokyo